Jari Risku (born 11 February 1966) is a Finnish ice hockey coach, currently serving as head coach of HPK Kiekkonaiset in the Naisten Liiga. He had a brief career as a professional ice hockey defenceman with Jokerit during 1984 to 1987, appearing in a total of 41 SM-liiga games across three seasons.

Coaching career
Risku most recently served as head coach of the Austrian national team for the 2022 IIHF Women's World Championship Division I Group A and was previously head coach of KMH Budapest in the European Women's Hockey League (EWHL) during the 2018–19 season. He was the first head coach of Team Kuortane from the team's creation in 2010 until 2018 – winning the Hannu Saintula Award in the 2017–18 season – and coached the Finnish national under-18 team during 2014 to 2018. An Olympic medalist as assistant coach of the Finnish national team that played in the women's ice hockey tournament at the 2010 Winter Olympics, he also led the Finnish team to a silver medal as head coach for the women's ice hockey tournament at the 2011 Winter Universiade.

References

External links
 

1966 births
Living people
Finnish expatriate ice hockey people in Austria
Finnish expatriate ice hockey people in Hungary
Finnish ice hockey coaches
Finnish ice hockey defencemen
Ice hockey people from Helsinki
Jokerit players
Naisten Liiga (ice hockey) coaches